Cahuilla Creek is a tributary stream of Wilson Creek which is in turn a tributary of Temecula Creek, and the Santa Margarita River in Riverside County, California. It flows southwest through the Anza Valley and Cahuilla Valley in the Cahuilla Indian Reservation to Wilson Creek, 7 miles south-southwest of Cahuilla Mountain and 20 miles south-southeast of San Jacinto.

References

Rivers of Riverside County, California
Rivers of Southern California